Magdalena Joanna Śliwa (née Szryniawska; born 17 November 1969) is a Polish volleyball player, a member of Poland women's national volleyball team in 1990–2007, double European Champion (2003, 2005), three-time Polish Champion (1994, 1995, 2003), Italian Champion (2002).

Personal life
She is married. On December 11, 1990 she gave birth to daughter Izabela, who is also volleyball player. Magdalena and her daughter played together in the same team - Atom Trefl Sopot in season 2010/2011.

Career

National team
On September 28, 2003 Poland women's national volleyball team, including Śliwa, beat Turkey (3–0) in final and won title of European Champion 2003. Two years later, Polish team with Śliwa in squad defended title and achieved second title of European Champion.

She was an assistant to Marco Bonitta for the Poland women's national volleyball team.

Sporting achievements

National team
 2003  CEV European Championship
 2005  CEV European Championship

State awards
 2005  Knight's Cross of Polonia Restituta

References

External links
 ORLENLiga player profile

1969 births
Living people
People from Miechów County
Sportspeople from Lesser Poland Voivodeship
Polish women's volleyball players
Knights of the Order of Polonia Restituta